WASP-54, also known as BD+00 3088, is a binary star system about 825 light-years away. The primary,  WASP-54A, is a F-type main-sequence star, accompanied by the red dwarf WASP-54B on a wide orbit.  WASP-54 is depleted in heavy elements, having 55% of the solar abundance of iron. The age of WASP-54 is slightly older than the Sun's at 6.9 billion years.

A multiplicity survey in 2017 did detect a red dwarf stellar companion WASP-54B 5.7″ away from WASP-54A. The companion was proven to be co-moving in 2020.

Planetary system
In 2012 a transiting hot Jupiter planet b was detected on a tight, mildly eccentric orbit around  WASP-54A.

References

Virgo (constellation)
F-type main-sequence stars
Binary stars
Planetary systems with one confirmed planet
Planetary transit variables
J13414903-0007410
Durchmusterung objects